The Great Blue Heron Music Festival is an annual music festival held the first or second weekend of July in Sherman, New York, a small town in the Amish country side of Western New York, United States. The Great Blue Heron Music Festival, or simply Blue Heron, as it is known, draws several thousand visitors throughout the course of three days. The Blue Heron presents over 30 musicians and bands between the three stages at the venue. Genres traditionally represented include bluegrass, Cajun, zydeco, African, reggae, Americana, old-time music, Irish music, and jam band.  However, in recent years, the festival has featured many contemporary, national acts such as Rusted Root and The Avett Brothers.

The first Blue Heron was held in 1992 Originally, the festival was conceived to be a small single-day gathering, featuring music from Donna The Buffalo. After the initial team meeting, the festival was expanded into a three-day event and continues in that format.

The festival grounds, covering over 300 acres, contains three stages. A single main stage showcases the majority of the daytime and headlining music, while a 'dance tent' functions as a side stage during the festival. In 2010, an additional stage was built adjacent to the cafe in the woods.

Artists that have performed
According to the Roster of Past Performers, the following artists have performed:

10,000 Maniacs
2 Cow Garage
Alison Pipitone
Allegany River Indian Dancers
Armor & Sturtevant
Atica
Baby Gramps
Balfa Toujours
Barton Barton Liuzzo & Ward
Barton Liuzzo & Ward
Barton-Johnson Band
Big Blow & The Bushwackers
Big Leg Emma
Bill Kirchen & Too Much Fun
Blue Sky Mission Club
Bobby Henrie & The Goners
Bollo Mah Kissy
Bombadil
Boojum Twist
Boy With A Fish
Bruce Peterson Blues Project
Bubba George Stringband
Buffalo Zydeco
Chanka Chank
Circus Of Dreams
Cold Lazarus
Colorblind James
Connell Bros Band
Cornerstone
Cowpoke Willis
Cri Du Bayou
Crow Greenspun
Dan Berggren
David Devine
Daybreak Radio
David Bromberg
Djava
Doctor Zoot
Donna the Buffalo
Edna's Driveway
Eight Naked Buddhas
Entrain
Finn & The Sharks
Five Cubic Feet
Fred Eaglesmith / Flying Squirrels
Funktional Flow 
Gandalp Murphy & The Slambovian
Gary Belloma & The Blue Bombers
Gokh-Bi System
Good Dog Bad Dog
Halley Devestern
Hank Roberts
Hillbilly Fun Park
Hillbilly Idol
Holly Figueroa
Hypnotic Clambake
Inner Orchestra
Inner Visions
Jamie Notarthomas
Jeff & Susie Goehring
Jenn Wertz & Lovechild
Jennie Stearns Band
Jim Donovan
Jimmyjohnnyjoe
Joe Thrift & Man Alive
John & Mary
John & Mary & The Valkyries
John Brown's Body
John Specker
Johnny Dowd Trio
J-San & The Analogue Sons
Kate Jacobs
Kathy Ziegler
Keith Lovett
Keith Secola & Wild Band Of Indians
Kelley And The Cowboys
Kilbrannan
Kinfolks
Lake Street Dive
Lejeune Jones
Leroy Thomas / Zydeco Roadrunners
Lightnin' Wells
Liz Berlin Band
Los Straitjackets
Mamma Tongue
Martin & Jessica Simpson
Mecca Bodega
Mercy Creek
Mojo Hand Blues Band
Moot Davis & The Cool Deal
New Nile Orchestra
New Paradigm
Oculus
One World Tribe
Organic Groove Farmers
Paso Fino
Peacefield
People of Earth
Pine Ridge
Plastic Nebraska
Ploughman's Lunch
Preston Frank
Psoas
Rasta Rafiki
Redheaded Stepchild
Ritual Space Travel Agency
River City Slim / Zydeco Hogs
Roy Carrier & The Night Rockers
Rusted Root
Sankai
Say Zuzu
Scott Carpenter & The Real Mccoys
Shoot The Moon
Sim Redmond Band
Slobberbone
Slo-Mo
Smackdab
Southern Culture on the Skids
Steel Pan Alley
Steve Riley and the Mamou Playboys
Stewed Mulligan
Sunny Weather
Tara Nevins & Friends
The Avett Brothers
The Big Wu
The Bill Ward Band
The Blazers
The Blue Grasshoppers
The Blues Jumpers
The Bruce Peterson Blues Project
The Buddhahood
The Burns Sisters
The Buvas
The Campbell Brothers
The Carpetbaggers
The Chicken Chokers (Reunion)
The Creole Cowboys
The Crumbles
The Darlin' Clementines
The Dashboard Saviors
The Delaney Brothers
The Derbines
The Drummer & The Dancer National Tour
The Earthworms
The Elektra Kings
The Freewill Savages
The Funnest Game
The Goodfellas
The Groovemongers
The Heartbeats
The Hickory Project
The Hindu Cowboys
The Hix
The Homewreckers
The Horse Flies
The Knuckleheads
The Lonesome Sisters
The Low Road
The Macgillicuddies
The Mighty Wallop!
The Mollys
The Naked Apes
The New Alien String Band
The New Dylans
The Overtakers
The Red Hots
The Red Stick Ramblers
The Sim Redmond Band
The Steam Donkeys
The Talk To Me's
The Tarbox Ramblers
The Town Pants
The Woodshed Trio
The Woodticks
Tiger Maple Stringband
Tim O'Brien
Tin Roof
Ti-Ti-Chickapea
Tom Stahl
Tonemah
Tony Vacca
Trevor Macdonald & Silver Bird
Turku
Turtle Island Dream
Viva Quetzal
Vox Lumina
Wicked Natural Stringband
Willis Prudhomme W/ Redline Zydeco
Xalat
Y'all
Yankee Zydeco Company
Yves Jean Band
Zekuhl
Zeta Cauliflower
Zydeco Experiment

References

External links

Festival Map

Music festivals in New York (state)
Tourist attractions in Chautauqua County, New York